Dave Revsine (born July 20, 1969 in Urbana, Illinois), is an American sportscaster, and sports columnist and journalist who currently serves as the lead studio host for the Big Ten Network. Previously, he was a journalist at ESPN anchoring on SportsCenter and ESPNEWS, along with play-by-play on select college basketball games.

Biography
Revsine attended Glenbrook North High School and graduated Phi Beta Kappa from Northwestern University in 1991. While at Northwestern, Revsine was heavily involved in broadcasting and became a sportscaster on WNUR Radio. Awarded a Rotary Ambassadorial Scholarship, Revsine lived abroad for a year after college. As a Rotary Scholar he attended Trinity College, Dublin and played on the school's basketball team.

Prior to becoming a sports journalist, Revsine was an investment banker at Chase Manhattan Bank in New York City. He worked there for one year prior to landing a job on TV as a Sports Anchor and Reporter at KXII-TV in Sherman, Texas. Shortly after, he worked in the Quad Cities for CBS affiliate WHBF-TV before being hired by ESPN in 1996.

ESPN
In his 10 years at ESPN, Revsine covered a wide range of programs including SportsCenter, College GameNight, NFL Live, NHL2Night and Outside the Lines. He also did play-by-play for roughly 25 college basketball games each year on ESPN and ESPN2.

Big Ten Network
In May, 2007, he announced his departure from ESPN to join the Big Ten Network as their lead studio host. Revsine officially left the network in late June of that year.

His words were the first ever on the Big Ten Network:

“Eleven schools, 252 varsity teams, one great network to cover it all. Welcome to the Big Ten Network, your ultimate source for Big Ten sports, featuring the games, passion and tradition of the nation’s foremost athletic conference.” – August 30, 2007

Currently, Revsine hosts Big Ten Tonight and Big Ten Football Saturday on the Big Ten Network as well as the NFL Mobile Gamecenter on Sprint Exclusive Entertainment. Revsine is also the author of the Numbers blog on BigTenNetwork.com and is featured on Comcast.net College Hoopla at win.comcast.net.

Author
In 2014, Revsine's first book, "The Opening Kickoff: The Tumultuous Birth of a Football Nation", was released.  It has received widespread critical acclaim, and made both The New York Times and Boston Globe Best-Seller lists.

References

External links
Dave Revsine bio and interview at Big Ten Network site
Dave Revsine, BTN studio host anchor at Twitter

1969 births
Writers from Urbana, Illinois
Living people
American radio sports announcers
American television sports announcers
Northwestern University alumni
College basketball announcers in the United States
College football announcers
Association football commentators